Rosie’s Place is a sanctuary for poor and homeless women located in Boston, Massachusetts.

History 
It was founded in 1974 by Kip Tiernan as the first shelter specifically for homeless women in the United States. It has evolved from providing meals and shelter to creating permanent solutions through advocacy, education and affordable housing. Rosie's Place relies solely on the generous support of individuals, foundations and corporations and does not accept any city, state or federal funding.

References

External links
 Rosie's Place website

Women in Massachusetts
Women's shelters in the United States
Homeless shelters in the United States
Homelessness organizations
Organizations based in Boston
Organizations established in 1974
South End, Boston
Women in Boston